The Milwaukee Road Depot in Marinette, Wisconsin was built in 1903 by the Chicago, Milwaukee, St. Paul and Pacific Railroad  (otherwise known as The Milwaukee Road) to replace an earlier depot.

Overview 

The depot is a one-story rectangular structure in the Queen Anne style. An open, covered area is located at one end of the depot. The depot originally had two passenger waiting areas, a women's waiting room at one end and the men's waiting room and freight room at the other. The station agent's office was located between the two waiting rooms. The depot was designed by J. U. Nettenstrom, a staff architect from the railroad. Nettenstrom also designed other depots in Wisconsin.

The railroads first entered Wisconsin for the lumber. Before the railroads, lumber had to be shipped by boat. Railroads allowed for the year-round harvesting of timber. The early economy of Marinette was based on the lumber industry. The Milwaukee Road entered Marinette in 1883. It built a spur from the mainline at Crivitz, Wisconsin to Marinette and Menominee, Michigan.

As the number of passengers declined on the Milwaukee Road after World War II, it ceased passenger trains to Marinette and Menominee. The depot was served by buses from Crivitz. The depot continued to serve freight. In 1985, The Milawaukee Road went out of business and sold the rail line and depot to the Escanaba and Lake Superior Railroad (E&LS). The E&LS continued to use the depot as an office until 2004. The land was sold in order to build a drugstore and to realign the city street. The depot was sold to a developer who moved it 400 feet to the south of its original position. The depot is still located adjacent to the E&LS tracks, thus preserving its setting. The developer plans to remodel the depot and make it into offices.

The depot was listed in the National Register of Historic Places because of its architecture and also because of its association with the commercial development of Marinette and with the railroad's association with the development of the timber industry.

References 
 Squitieri, Amy R., Sarah Davis McBride, Emily Schill and Erin Pogany. Milwaukee Road Depot (Marinette County, Wisconsin) National Register of Historic Places Registration Form, National Park Service, Washington, DC, 2004.

Railway stations on the National Register of Historic Places in Wisconsin
Railway stations in the United States opened in 1903
Marinette
Former railway stations in Wisconsin
Victorian architecture in Wisconsin
National Register of Historic Places in Marinette County, Wisconsin